KFF (Kaiser Family Foundation), also known as The Henry J. Kaiser Family Foundation, is an American non-profit organization, headquartered in San Francisco, California. It prefers KFF since its legal name can cause confusion as it is no longer a foundation or a family foundation, and is not associated with Kaiser Permanente. KFF focuses on major health care issues facing the nation, as well as U.S. role in global health policy. KFF states that it is a non-partisan source of facts and analysis, polling and journalism for policymakers, the media, the health care community, and the general public, and its website has been heralded for having the "most up-to-date and accurate information on health policy" and as a "must-read for healthcare devotees."

Current activities

Policy analysis and polling
KFF publishes analysis, polling and journalism about health-care issues, and states that much of its work especially concerns persons with low income or those who are otherwise especially vulnerable to health-care cost, such as the uninsured, those with chronic illnesses, or Medicaid/Medicare recipients. In addition to domestic U.S. health policy issues, KFF also conducts work on the U.S. role in global health policy.

In early 2020 its analysis and polling focused heavily on the COVID-19 pandemic. In 2010, KFF began providing resources for consumers seeking information about the then new health insurance law, the Patient Protection and Affordable Care Act with a series of animated videos explaining the health law and health insurance terms as well as a calculator for people to estimate what health insurance coverage would cost them.

Kaiser is well known for public opinion research, documenting the views and experiences of the public on health and related issuesoften in partnership with major news organizations, such as The Washington Post and The New York Times.

Health news and information
Through KHN (Kaiser Health News), KFF's editorially independent news service dedicated to coverage of health care policy and politics, KFF provides coverage of health policy issues and developments at the federal and state levels in the health care marketplace and health care delivery system.

KHN reporters were finalists for a 2020 Pulitzer Prize in Investigative Reporting for exposing predatory bill collection by the University of Virginia Health System that relentlessly squeezed low-income patients—many into bankruptcy—forcing the non-profit, state-run hospital to change its tactics.

KFF also sponsors training and site visits for health care reporters.

KFF works with major media and corporate partners, government agencies and health departments, national leadership and community organizations, and other foundations to undertake large-scale public information campaigns on pressing health and social issues, mostly on HIV/AIDS, including (current and former campaigns): It's Your (Sex) Life (MTV); GYT: Get Yourself Tested (MTV, CDC, Planned Parenthood); Rap it Up (BET); KNOW HIV/AIDS (Viacom and CBS Corporation); Enterate Protegate and Soy… (Univision); and PAUSE (Fox Broadcasting Network).

KFF worked with UNAIDS in 2004 to launch the Global Media AIDS Initiative at the United Nations to mobilize media in response to the global AIDS pandemic.  Large-scale regional media coalitions operated under auspices of the GMAI, including efforts in Africa, the Caribbean, the Asia-Pacific region, Eastern Europe and now developing Central and South America.

Under Greater Than AIDSa national public information response to the U.S. epidemic launched in 2009KFF works with a broad cross-section of public and private partners to increase knowledge, reduce stigma and promote actions to stem the spread of HIV. While national in scope, Greater Than AIDS focuses on communities most affected.

History
KFF was established in 1948 by Henry J. Kaiser.   The Kaiser Family Foundation was originally set up in Oakland, California, the same city in which Kaiser Permanente's headquarters were located. Later, KFF moved to Sand Hill Road in Menlo Park, about 35 miles away from Oakland.  In 2018, it relocated to San Francisco, CA.

When Kaiser died in 1967, his second wife, Ale Chester, inherited half of his estate, and the other half went to the KFF. Ale sold all of her holdings, moved far away, and remarried. Mr. Kaiser's children received very little direct inheritance; but did receive authority to run the Kaiser Industries businesses, and the Kaiser Family Foundation.

In 1977, ten years after Kaiser's death, the conglomerate of disparate Kaiser Industries organizations split apart. The Kaiser Family Foundation was initially a major owner of these shares: at the time of dissolution, the foundation owned 32 percent, according to 
Fortune Magazine.

By 1985, the foundation no longer had an ownership stake in the Kaiser companies and is no longer associated with Kaiser Permanente or Kaiser Industries. KFF is now an independent national organization and one family member, selected by the Board, serves on the Board of Directors of KFF.

The Kaiser Family Foundation previously funded professorial chairs at UC Berkeley, Stanford University, Harvard University, and Johns Hopkins University, named the Henry J. Kaiser Professorships.

Starting in September 1990, KFF CEO Drew Altman directed "a complete overhaul of the Foundation's mission and operating style." Altman changed a "sleepy grant-making organization" (some $30 million a year interest on the $400 million endowment), into a leading voice and repository for facts and information on health-care issues.

Notable members of the board of trustees
 Jim Doyle, former Governor of Wisconsin
 Charles Gibson, former anchor of ABC World News
 Kathleen Sebelius, former United States Secretary of Health and Human Services
 Olympia Snowe, former United States Senator

References

External links
 Official KFF website
 Kaiser Health News (KHN) website
 Greater Than AIDSPublic education campaign Web site with Black AIDS Media Partnership

1948 establishments in California
Healthcare reform advocacy groups in the United States
Henry J. Kaiser
Medical and health foundations in the United States
Medical and health organizations based in California
Menlo Park, California
Non-profit organizations based in the San Francisco Bay Area
Organizations established in 1948